Pristimantis thymelensis is a species of frog in the family Strabomantidae.
It is found in Colombia and Ecuador.
Its natural habitats are tropical moist shrubland and high-altitude grassland.

References

thymelensis
Amphibians of Colombia
Amphibians of Ecuador
Amphibians of the Andes
Amphibians described in 1972
Taxonomy articles created by Polbot